A Girl from Paris is a 1954 West German comedy film directed by Franz Seitz, Jr. and starring Etchika Choureau, Erich Schellow, and Hans Leibelt. The film's sets were designed by the art director Arne Flekstad. Location shooting took place in Munich and Paris. It premiered at West Berlin's Marmorhaus cinema.

Cast
 Etchika Choureau
 Erich Schellow
 Hans Leibelt
 Josef Sieber
 Anneliese Kaplan
 John Van Dreelen
 Oliver Hassencamp
 Margarete Haagen
 Ferdinand Anton
 Otto Brüggemann
 Hildegard Busse
 Jochen Diestelmann
 Angèle Durand
 Waldemar Frahm
 Harry Hertzsch
 Emiljosef Hunek
 Bruno Hübner
 Herbert Hübner
 Karl Kunst
 Joachim Mock
 Rolf Olsen
 Karl-Heinz Peters
 Alfred Pongratz
 Gisela Reiche
 Raymond Rives
 Paul Schlander
 Ida Shoemaker
 Wolfgang Wahl
 Annelore Wied
 Elisabeth Wischert

References

Bibliography

External links
 

1954 films
1954 comedy films
German comedy films
West German films
1950s German-language films
Films directed by Franz Seitz
German black-and-white films
1950s German films